The 2020–21 season is Ross County's second consecutive season in the Scottish Premiership and the club's 8th season overall in the top flight of Scottish football. Ross County will also compete in the Scottish Cup and Scottish League Cup. Stuart Kettlewell was sacked as the club's manager on 19 December, after a defeat to Hamilton. John Hughes was appointed as the new manager on 21 December.

Results and fixtures

Pre-season

Scottish Premiership

League table

Matches

Scottish League Cup

Matches

Scottish Cup

Matches

Squad statistics

Appearances
As of 16 May 2021

|-
|colspan="10"|Players who left the club during the season
|-

|-
|}

Goalscorers

Transfers

In

Out

See also
 List of Ross County F.C. seasons

Notes and references

2020-21
Ross County